is a Japanese national highway connecting the two largest cities of Hokkaido, Sapporo and Asahikawa. The  highway begins at an intersection with National Routes 36 and 230 in Sapporo. It travels northeast across the western side of Hokkaido to Asahikawa where it ends at an intersection with National Routes 39 and 40.

Route description
National Route 12 is a  highway in western Hokkaido that runs north from Sapporo to Asahikawa. Its southern terminus lies at an intersection in Chūō-ku, Sapporo where it meets National Routes 36 and 230. Along the way from Sapporo to Asahikawa, it passes through the cities of Ebetsu, Iwamizawa, Takikawa, and Fukagawa. The highway is closely paralleled by the tolled Dō-Ō Expressway and it functions as free alternative route to the expressway between Sapporo and Asahikawa. A notable section of the highway between the cities of Bibai and Takikawa is known for being the longest straight section of roadway in Japan. Its northern terminus in Asahikawa is the intersection where it meets National Routes 39 and 40.

History

Ordered by Genrōin secretary Kaneko Kentarō, construction on the road began in April 1886. It was completed in 90 days by making use of prison labor from the prisoners that were to be incarcerated at Abashiri Prison in northeastern Hokkaido. The prison laborers were mainly political dissidents that Kaneko viewed as morally deficient. Construction of the Kamikawa Road and the others leading from the more-developed southern part of Hokkaido to the prison were of strategic importance to Japan, which viewed Hokkaido as being vulnerable to an invasion from their neighbor, the Russian Empire. On 4 December 1952 the highway was designated by the Cabinet of Japan as Primary National Highway 12 between Sapporo and Asahikawa. On 1 April 1965 it was reclassified as General National Highway 12 without any changes being made to its routing.

Major junctions
The route lies entirely within Hokkaido.

Auxiliary routes

Takikawa Bypass

The Takikawa Bypass is a  auxiliary route of National Route 12 that travels to the east and north of the central district of Takikawa. From its southern terminus with its parent route, it heads north and crosses over the Sorachi River. It has a junction with National Route 38. After this junction the Takikawa Bypass travels northeast, paralleling the main line of National Route 12 until it reaches Hokkaido Route 776. From there it heads northwest towards its northern terminus at a junction with National Route 12.

Asahikawa Shindō
The Asahikawa Shindō is a  auxiliary route of National Route 12 that travels to the west and north of the central district of Asahikawa. From its southern terminus with its parent route, it heads north and crosses over the Ishikari River. After that it curves to the northeast and has a junction with the Dō-Ō Expressway. North of central Asahikawa the highway curves to the southeast. It meets National Route 40 just before crossing over the Ishikari River once more. The highway then meets its northern terminus at an intersection with National Route 39.

References

External links

012
Roads in Hokkaido